is a Japanese yonkoma manga series written and drawn by Michinoku Atami. The manga is published online in Ichijinsha's Zero-Sum Online with first tankōbon format released on September 25, 2015. The manga is licensed in North America by Seven Seas Entertainment. This work parodies BL's cliche and fandom, but is more focused on the genre, than other elements.

An anime adaptation was produced by EMT Squared and broadcast in Japan from July 5, 2016 with each episode 4 minutes long.

Plot
Ryo Sakaguchi has a deep, dark secret: he's a fudanshi straight boy obsessed with boys' love (BL), the genre of stories revolving around the romance between two men. While he has trouble understanding how others don't find the same bliss he does from his unusual hobbies, that doesn't make it any easier for Ryo to buy his precious manga from the “girls” section of the store, or any simpler, explaining the world of boys’ love, shipping wars, and dojinshi circles to his best friend Nakamura. Will Ryo find other fanboys to share his hobby with, or is he doomed to sit alone on his throne of BL romance?

Characters

The series' protagonist. He is nicknamed . He really likes BL to the point that he gets excited over everything that resembles BL in real life, but is too shy to buy BL dōjinshi by himself because of his sex. Despite his hobby, he is straight.

Sakaguchi's friend who doesn't like BL, but still understands his friend's hobby even though he sometimes questions Sakaguchi's real sexual orientation.

At first glance she is a normal high school girl, but is actually a fujoshi. By chance she becomes friends with Sakaguchi, and becomes the one who introduces Sakaguchi to the whole new level of BL love by taking him to the Comiket. The work implies that she has something for Ryo, but so far it has not developed.

Sakaguchi's friend who is a cross-dressing homosexual and president of the Cooking Club. Even though he acts completely like a woman, his strength is similar to a delinquent.

Shiratori's servant who will do anything for him. Akira is not gay though, which parodies BL-bait fan-service in anime and manga.

A fudanshi whose class is next to Sakaguchi's and apparently a BL doujinshika.

A cooking club member who joined the club because his childhood friend always says meals cooked by Keichi are bland.

Keichi's childhood friend. He's so close and jealous of Keichi that Ryo regularly comments that their friendship looks like a BL-subtext manga.

Rumi's (normal) friend.

Reiji's younger sister. A shrine maiden who likes Keiichi but who is continuously blocked by her brother.

Media

Manga
The yonkoma manga was written and drawn by Atami Michinoku and published online in Ichijinsha's Zero-Sum Online. The series so far has been compiled into three tankōbon as of November 2016. Seven Seas Entertainment announced that it had licensed the manga in North America on August 5, 2016.

Volume List

Anime
The anime is directed by Toshikatsu Tokoro at EMT Squared with Chinatsu Ishida adapting Michinoku's original design. Nobuyuki Abe as sound director while DAX Production handled the sound production. Dream Creation handled the production. The theme song titled  is sung by Ryō Sakaguchi's voice actor Wataru Hatano.

The blu-ray and DVD were released on October 14, 2016 containing all 12 episodes of the anime.

Episode List

Web Radio
A web radio titled  started airing from July 3, 2016 on Anitama for 30 minutes an episode, with Hatano Wataru (Sakaguchi Ryō) and Suzaki Aya (Nishihara Rumi) as hosts.

Notes

References

External links
 Manga official page  
 Anime official website 
 

Comedy anime and manga
Crunchyroll anime
EMT Squared
Ichijinsha manga
Japanese webcomics
LGBT in anime and manga
Seven Seas Entertainment titles
Shōjo manga
Yonkoma